Annelie Nilsson  (born 14 June 1971) was a female Swedish football goalkeeper. She was part of the Sweden women's national football team. She competed at the 1996 Summer Olympics, playing 3 matches. On club level she played for Sunnanå SK.

See also
 Sweden at the 1996 Summer Olympics

References

External links
 
 
 
 http://articles.latimes.com/1996-07-22/news/ss-26861_1_brazil-tie-norway
 https://www.nytimes.com/1996/07/25/sports/atlanta-day-6-notebook-hamm-s-soccer-status-in-doubt.html

1971 births
Living people
Swedish women's footballers
Place of birth missing (living people)
Footballers at the 1996 Summer Olympics
Olympic footballers of Sweden
Women's association football goalkeepers
Sweden women's international footballers
1995 FIFA Women's World Cup players